Evans Fordyce Carlson (February 26, 1896 – May 27, 1947) was a decorated and retired United States Marine Corps general officer who was the legendary leader of "Carlson's Raiders" during World War II. Many credit Carlson with developing the tactics and attitude that would later come to define America's special operations forces.  He is renowned for the "Makin Island raid" in 1942, and his raiders' "Long Patrol" (aka Carlson's patrol) behind Japanese lines on Guadalcanal, in which 488 Japanese were killed. Carlson popularized the phrase "gung-ho".

Early years
Evans Carlson was born on February 26, 1896, in Sidney, New York, the son of a Congregationalist minister. He ran away from his home in Vermont in 1910 and two years later disguised his age to enter the United States Army.

U.S. Army service
During his first enlistment in the army, he served in the Philippines and Hawaii.  He was discharged in 1916 as a "top" or first sergeant. Less than a year later, he returned to the army and participated in the Mexican punitive expedition.

World War I
During World War I, he saw action in France, and was awarded a Wound Chevron (later exchanged for the Purple Heart Medal) for wounds received in action. He was commissioned a second lieutenant in May 1917, and made captain of field artillery in December 1917. He served in Germany with the Army of Occupation.  He was discharged from the army in 1921.

U.S. Marine Corps career
Carlson's career as a Marine started in 1922 when he enlisted as a private. In 1923, he was again commissioned a second lieutenant. After duty at MCB Quantico, Virginia, he sailed for Culebra, Puerto Rico in 1924 and remained there five months before being ordered to the West Coast for duty with the Pacific Fleet. Applying for aviation training in 1925, he went to Naval Aeronautical Station Pensacola, Florida, for instruction, but was subsequently returned to duty with ground units. He served another tour of foreign shore duty from 1927 to 1929 at Shanghai, China.

Nicaragua
Carlson was ordered to Nicaragua in 1930 as an officer in the Guardia Nacional. A first lieutenant at the time, he earned his first Navy Cross for leading 12 Marines against 100 bandits in a night attack to break up a threat to his garrison. He was also commended for his actions following the 1931 earthquake at Managua, and for performance of duties as Chief of Police in 1932 and 1933.

Friendship with the Roosevelts
Returning to the United States in 1933, Captain Carlson served as executive officer of the Marine Corps Detachment at President Roosevelt's alternative White House and vacation retreat at Warm Springs, Georgia, where he became closely acquainted with President Franklin D. Roosevelt and his son James.

Second and third China tours
After his Warm Springs tour Carlson was posted to the 4th Marines in Shanghai. Shortly afterward he was transferred to the Marine detachment, American Legation, Peiping, China, where he served as adjutant and studied the Chinese language. In 1936, he returned to the United States via Japan. At home he served at Quantico while attending Marine Corps Schools, and studying International Law and Politics at George Washington University in Washington, D.C.

He went back to China for the third time in 1937 as an official student of the Chinese language and as a military observer with Chinese forces. There he was afforded the opportunity to learn the tactics of the Japanese soldier.

He met Edgar Snow in China and read Snow's Red Star Over China. This encounter led him to visit the Chinese communist troop headquarters in northern China, where he met Chinese Communist leaders such as Mao Zedong, Zhou Enlai and Deng Xiaoping. Traveling thousands of miles through the interior of China with the communist guerrillas, often on foot and horseback over the most hazardous terrain, he lived under the same primitive conditions. He was impressed by the tactics used by Chinese Communist guerrillas to fight Japanese troops. Carlson adopted the phrase "gung ho" from Rewi Alley's Chinese Industrial Cooperatives. Carlson often had leftwing political views, prompting General David M. Shoup to say of him, "He may be red, but he's not yellow."

When Carlson left China in 1938, he was commended by the commander in chief of the Asiatic Fleet for his services. Carlson was so impressed with the danger of Japanese aggression in the Far East that in 1939, he resigned his commission as a captain in order to be free to write and lecture on that subject. When the danger he foresaw neared reality in 1941, Carlson applied to be recommissioned in the Marine Corps and was accepted with the rank of major.

World War II, "Carlson's Raiders"

In 1942, he was placed in command of the Second Marine Raider Battalion with the rank of lieutenant colonel, a new combat organization whose creation he influenced. Because of his relationship with President Roosevelt and the president's son, Captain James Roosevelt, a Marine reserve captain who authored a letter to the Commandant of the Marine Corps proposing the creation of the Raiders, the Marine Corps authorized the creation of the Raiders despite misgivings about Carlson's philosophy.

In the United States military there was a sharp caste-system divide between officers and enlisted personnel, and even experienced noncommissioned officers were expected to be subservient to even the newest, greenest second lieutenant. Drawing on his time in China and his experience in having gone back and forth between officer and enlisted status in both the army and the Marine Corps that this was not in the best interests of the service, Carlson radically reformed the raider battalion along much more egalitarian lines. Leaders were expected to serve the unit and the fighters they led, not to be served. Responsibility, not privilege, would be the keyword for battalion leadership when the Second Raiders formed up. Using an egalitarian and team-building approach, Carlson promulgated a new way for senior NCOs to mentor junior officers and work with the officers for the betterment of the unit. Even more controversial in concept, Carlson gave his men "ethical indoctrination," designed to "give (his men) conviction through persuasion," describing for each man what he was fighting for and why.

Of more lasting importance to the Marine Corps, Carlson also changed the organization of his squads, eschewing an eight-man squad dictated by the Marines in favor of a 10-man squad composed of a squad leader and three 3-man "fireteams", each containing a BAR, a Thompson, and an M1 rifle.

Carlson's leadership of the Second Raiders in the Makin Raid, August 17, 1942, earned him a second Navy Cross (-inch gold star in lieu of second Navy Cross). He received a third Navy Cross (second -inch gold star in lieu of third Navy Cross) for extraordinary heroism and distinguished leadership on Guadalcanal in November and December 1942.

On March 15, 1943, the four raider battalions were placed under the control of the newly created 1st Raider Regiment, commanded by the former commander of the 3rd Raiders, Col. Harry B. Liversedge. A week later Carlson was relieved as commander of the 2nd Raiders by Lt. Col. Alan Shapley, an officer of much more orthodox thinking, and made executive officer of the 1st Raider Regiment. Within a month Shapley had reorganized the 2nd Raiders into a traditional organization, and Liversedge then standardized the organization of the four raider battalions along the lines of the 1st Raider Battalion, although all adopted the 3-fireteam squad-organization concept pioneered by Carlson, which was soon adopted by the Marine Corps as a whole.

Later service in the Pacific
Carlson was soon ordered back to the United States for medical treatment of malaria and jaundice, and served as a technical advisor to Walter Wanger's Gung Ho!: The Story of Carlson's Makin Island Raiders (released December 1943).

He subsequently returned to the Pacific campaign and participated in the Battle of Tarawa in November 1943, as an observer, and was cited for volunteering to carry vital information through enemy fire from an advanced post to division headquarters. During the Battle of Saipan in 1944, he was wounded while attempting to rescue a wounded enlisted radioman from a front-line observation post, and was awarded a second Purple Heart (-inch gold star in lieu of second Purple Heart).

Retirement and death

Physical disability resulting from the wounds received on Saipan caused Carlson's retirement on July 1, 1946. He was advanced to the rank of brigadier general on the retired list at that time for having been specially commended for the performance of duty in actual combat.

On May 27, 1947, at age 51, Carlson died as the result of a cardiac ailment at Emanuel Hospital in Portland, Oregon. He had been living in Brightwood, Oregon, since his retirement. He was survived by his wife, Mrs. Peggy Tatum Carlson, and a son by a previous marriage, Evans C. Carlson.

General Carlson is buried in Arlington National Cemetery.

Awards and decorations
General Carlson's awards include:

Navy Cross citations
Nicaragua (May 16, 1930 – May 1, 1931)
CARLSON, EVANS FORDYCE
First Lieutenant, U.S. Marine Corps
Guardia Nacional de Nicaragua
Date of Action: May 16, 1930 – May 1, 1931
The Navy Cross is presented to Evans Fordyce Carlson, First Lieutenant, U.S. Marine Corps, for extraordinary heroism while attached to the Guardia Nacional from May 16, 1930, to May 1, 1931. Upon joining the Guardia Nacional, First Lieutenant Carlson was assigned at Jalapa in the bandit area of Nueva Segovia. On July 8, 1930, he received a report that a group of one hundred bandits were looting the town of Portillo. He immediately left with a detachment of sixteen men to gain contact. Four of the men deserted en route but with the remaining twelve men he pushed on and overtook and gained contact with a group of forty bandits, completely routing them, killing two and wounding seven, without any casualties to his detachment. Arms, ammunition, equipment and clothing looted from the town of Portillo were recaptured. Lieutenant Carlson maintained his district in a most excellent manner and by his activities and well-directed operations kept it singularly free from banditry.

Makin Island, Raid (August 17–18, 1942)
CARLSON, EVANS FORDYCE
Lieutenant Colonel, U.S. Marine Corps (Reserve)
Commanding Officer, 2d Marine Raider Battalion 
Date of Action: August 17–18, 1942
The Navy Cross is presented to Evans Fordyce Carlson, Lieutenant Colonel, U.S. Marine Corps (Reserve), for extraordinary heroism and distinguished service as Commanding Officer of the Second Marine Raider Battalion in action against Japanese forces on Makin Island, August 17–18, 1942. In the first operation of this type ever conducted by United States forces, Lieutenant Colonel Carlson personally directed his forces in the face of intense fire of enemy ground troops and aerial bombing barrage, inflicting great personnel and material damage on the enemy. In the withdrawal of his forces under adverse sea conditions, he displayed outstanding resourcefulness, initiative and resolute purpose in evacuating all wounded and disabled men. His high courage and excellent leadership throughout the engagement were in keeping with the finest traditions of the United States Naval Service.SPOT AWARD, October 1942

Guadalcanal, Long Patrol (November 4 – December 4, 1942)
CARLSON, EVANS FORDYCE
Lieutenant Colonel, U.S. Marine Corps (Reserve) 
Commanding Officer, 2d Marine Raider Battalion
Date of Action: November 4 – December 4, 1942
The Navy Cross is presented to Evans Fordyce Carlson, Lieutenant Colonel, U.S. Marine Corps (Reserve), for extraordinary heroism and courage as leader of the Second Marine Raider Battalion in action against enemy forces in the British Solomon Islands during the period from November 4 to December 4, 1942. In the face of most difficult conditions of tropical weather and heavy growth, Lieutenant Colonel Carlson led his men in a determined and aggressive search for threatening hostile forces, overcoming all opposition and completing their mission with small losses to our men while taking heavy toll of the enemy. His personal valor and inspiring fortitude reflect great credit upon Lieutenant Colonel Carlson, his command and the United States Naval Service.SPOT AWARD, January 1943

Bibliography
Carlson wrote books about his third tour in China when he was attached to the Chinese 8th Route Army:
Twin Stars of China, Dodd, Mead & Company, 1940.
The Chinese army its organization and military efficiency, International Secretariat, Institute of Pacific Relations, 1939. (ASIN B00089LO5S)
Evans F. Carlson on China at War, 1937–1941, China and U.S. Publication. (ASIN B0006F13D2)

See also

Marine Raiders
Merritt Edson

Notes

References
, Who's Who in Marine Corps History, History Division, United States Marine Corps. (URL accessed November 27, 2021)
Evans F. Carlson, Brigadier General, United States Marine Corps, Arlington National Cemetery profile.

Further reading
Wukovits, John. "American Commando: Evans Carlson, His WWII Marine Raiders and America's First Special Forces Mission",  Dutton Caliber, 2010. (ISBN 0451229983)
Blankfort, Michael. The Big Yankee: The Life of Carlson of the Raiders, Boston: Little, Brown and Company, 1947. (ASIN B0007HNZ8K)
Haughey, David W. "Carlson's Raid on Makin Island", Feature, Marine Corps Gazette 85(8): 56–64, August 31, 2001.
Merillat, Herbert C. (Captain, USMCR) The Island: A History of the Marines On Guadalcanal, Boston: Houghton Mifflin Company, 1944. (Details Carlson's Long Patrol on Guadalcanal)
Quirk, Brian J. "Reflections of Carlson's Raiders", Commentary, Marine Corps Gazette 85(8):58–61, August 31, 2001.

Smith, George W. Carlson's Raid : The Daring Marine Assault on Makin, Presidio Press, 2001.
Young, Howard. "Carlson's Raiders on Makin, August 17–18, 1942, Marine Corps Gazette'' 87(8): August 31, 2003.

External links
Richardson-Moore, . "A Marine Legacy", Furman Magazine.  Carol Carlson Loving on her grandfather. (PDF file, from the U.S. Embassy in Beijing China)

1896 births
1947 deaths
United States Army personnel of World War I
United States Marine Corps personnel of World War II
Marine Raiders
Recipients of the Navy Cross (United States)
Recipients of the Legion of Merit
Recipients of the War Merit Cross (Italy)
United States Marine Corps generals
People from Delaware County, New York
Burials at Arlington National Cemetery
People from Clackamas County, Oregon
American military personnel of the Banana Wars
United States Army officers
Military personnel from Oregon